The 2015 New Mexico Bowl was a college football bowl game that was played on December 19, 2015 at University Stadium in Albuquerque, New Mexico. The tenth annual New Mexico Bowl, it pitted the University of New Mexico Lobos of the Mountain West Conference against the University of Arizona Wildcats of the Pac-12 Conference. It was one of the 2015–16 bowl games that concluded the 2015 FBS football season. The game started at 12:20 p.m. MST and aired on ESPN. Sponsored by clothing company Gildan Activewear, the game was officially known as the Gildan New Mexico Bowl.

Team selection
The game featured the New Mexico Lobos against the Arizona Wildcats. It was the 67th overall meeting between these teams, with Arizona leading the series 43–20–3 before this game (both had previously been in-conference rivals in the Border Conference and the Western Athletic Conference before Arizona joined the Pacific-10 Conference (now the Pac-12 Conference) and New Mexico joined the Mountain West. The last meeting between these two teams was in 2008, when the Lobos beat the Wildcats 36–28 in Albuquerque.

Arizona Wildcats

Arizona head coach Rich Rodriguez had led the Wildcats to bowl appearances in each of his four seasons with the school. Overall, Rodriguez entered with a 4–5 bowl record as the head coach at Arizona (2–1), Michigan (0–1) and West Virginia (2–3).

New Mexico Lobos

This was the first bowl appearance for the Lobos under fourth-year head coach Bob Davie, who had three previous bowl appearances as the head coach at Notre Dame. UNM entered 3–7–1 all time in bowl games, with their last appearance being a win in the 2007 New Mexico Bowl. The Lobos play their home games at the New Mexico Bowl site – University Stadium – and had a 5–2 record in 2015 at home.

Game summary

Scoring summary

Source:

Statistics

See also
 Arizona–New Mexico football rivalry

References

2015–16 NCAA football bowl games
2015
2015 New Mexico Bowl
2015 New Mexico Bowl
December 2015 sports events in the United States
2015 in sports in New Mexico